José María Palacios Moraza (September 2, 1935 – April 21, 2002), known by the pseudonym of Ogueta was a Basque pelota player in the category of hand-pelota. Often considered one of the best pelotaris of the history of Álava, in 1979 a professional fronton was named after him in Vitoria, the capital city of the province: the Ogueta fronton.

Championships

1st hand-pelota singles

1st hand-pelota doubles 

Spanish pelotaris
1935 births
2002 deaths
Sportspeople from Vitoria-Gasteiz
Pelotaris from the Basque Country (autonomous community)